Enköpings SK HK (short for "Enköpings SK Hockeyklubb" or Enköpings SK Hockey Club, also shortened to Enköpings SK, or simply Enköping Hockey) is an ice hockey club located in the Swedish city of Enköping, and the ice hockey section of sports club Enköpings SK.  The team currently plays in the 1C subgroup of Division 1, the third tier of Swedish ice hockey.

External links
Official site
Profile on Eliteprospects.com

Ice hockey teams in Sweden
Ice hockey teams in Uppsala County